Cornufer akarithymus is a species of frog in the family Ceratobatrachidae.
It is endemic to Papua New Guinea, on New Britain Island.  It has been observed in three mountain ranges: Whiteman, Nakanai, and Baining.

Its natural habitat is subtropical or tropical moist lowland forests.
It is threatened by habitat loss.

References

akarithymus
Amphibians of Papua New Guinea
Taxonomy articles created by Polbot
Amphibians described in 1968